Huya was an Egyptian noble living around 1350 BC. He was  the "Superintendent of the Royal Harem", "Superintendent of the Treasury" and "Superintendent of the House", all titles that are associated with Queen Tiye, mother of Akhenaten.

He had a tomb constructed in the Northern cemetery at Amarna, although his remains have never been identified. His tomb contained a large amount of material about the royal family and the Aten cult, including a Hymn to the Aten.

References

External links
Northern tomb no. 1 of Huya

Officials of the Eighteenth Dynasty of Egypt
14th-century BC Egyptian people